The  were a Nippon Professional Baseball (NPB) team based in Osaka, Japan, which was in the Pacific League. In 2005 the team was merged with the Orix BlueWave to become the team now known as the Orix Buffaloes. The team played  in Fujiidera Stadium, and later in Osaka Dome.

Although the team won four Pacific League championships, they lost all four Japan Series in which they played. The team's batting lineup was known as Itemae Dasen (いてまえ打線).

Logo design 
A stylized buffalo's head with angry-looking red eyes (designed by Okamoto Taro), or "Buffaloes" in red script, outlined with white. Another logo featured the "Buffaloes" in red script, while also featuring Buffie, the Buffaloes mascot.

Franchise history 
The team was founded in 1949 and began play in 1950 in the newly organized NPB. Owned by Kinki Nippon Railway Co. (later known as Kintetsu Railway), the franchise was known as the Kintetsu Pearls from 1950-1958, Kintetsu Buffalo from 1959-1961, the Kintetsu Buffaloes from 1962-1998, and the Osaka Kintetsu Buffaloes from 1999-2004. In 1961, the Buffaloes lost 103 games that year. As of 2022, it is NPB's only 100 loss season.

The Kintetsu Buffalo were among the first Japanese teams to sign American players. They signed former major league pitcher Glenn Mickens and catcher Ron Bottler for the 1959 season. Mickens had played for the Brooklyn Dodgers in 1953 and Bottler had been a career minor league catcher in the United States. Mickens played for five years in Japan, compiling a record of 45–53 with a 2.54 ERA. Bottler played for the Buffalo for three seasons, gradually converting from catcher to starting pitcher, where he had more success.

It took 30 years for the franchise to win its first Pacific League title, in 1979, but it lost the Japan Series to the Hiroshima Toyo Carp 4-games-to-3. The Buffaloes made it back to the Japan Series in 1980, but again lost to Hiroshima by the same margin.

The franchise's most notable player was pitcher Keishi Suzuki, who played for the Buffaloes from 1966 to 1985, compiling a won-loss record of 317–238, a 3.11 ERA, and 3,061 strikeouts. He was elected to the Japanese Baseball Hall of Fame in 2002.

In 1988, the Buffaloes were so close to making the Japan Series, after tying a second game in a double-header against the Lotte Orions. In order for Kintetsu to win the pennant, they had to win both games.

They would make the Japan Series the following year, but just barely, after being .001 winning percentage higher than the second place Orix Braves, but lost to the Giants in the first reverse sweep since the 1958 Japan Series.

American outfielder Ralph Bryant starred for the Buffaloes from 1988-1995, in the process becoming one of the best left-handed power hitters in Japanese baseball history. He won the season MVP award that year, and also tied Sadaharu Oh's career record for hitting three home runs in a game five times. Bryant also struck out countless times, and holds the top four spots on the single-season strikeout records in Nippon Professional Baseball.

Pitcher Hideo Nomo starred for the Buffaloes from 1990–1994 before he exercised a loophole in his contract and "retired," allowing him to sign with MLB's Los Angeles Dodgers. The subsequent wave of players moving to Major League Baseball has become a fixture of Japanese professional baseball. To combat this, MLB and NPB agreed to make the posting system, which allowed players in NPB to "post" and allowed them to move to MLB. Without Nomo, the Buffaloes struggled in pitching, with a 4.16 ERA and 4.70 FIP after Nomo's departure.

In 2000, the Buffaloes signed Mexican pitcher Narciso Elvira. While he had terrible pitching, he was noted for being the only Mexican player in NPB history as of 2022 to throw a no-hitter, and only allowing 4 walks. He was cut 6 games into the Buffaloes' 2001 Pacific League championship season, and then signed with the Samsung Lions of the KBO League and won the 2002 Korean Series with them.

Tuffy Rhodes played for the Buffaloes for eight seasons from 1996–2003, hitting 288 home runs over that span. For the rest of the season, opposing pitchers intentionally walked Rhodes to prevent him from breaking Oh's record. Rhodes also played in tandem with Norihiro Nakamura, who also hit 46 home runs that same season. Together, they became a deadly hitting tandem, and the Buffaloes had one of the most dominant offenses in the league.

Despite the efforts of Rhodes and Nakamura, the Buffaloes could still not win the Japan Series, as they lost to the Tokyo Yakult Swallows in 5 games in the 2001 Japan Series. The Buffaloes are the second team to make the Japan Series but never win it, the first being the short lived Shochiku Robins, who only made the Japan Series in NPB's inaugural season, losing to the Mainichi Orions (now Chiba Lotte Marines) before folding at the end of the following season and being merged with the Taiyo Whales (now Yokohama DeNA BayStars).

Sale and merger 

In 2004 the team was sold to the Orix Group, the owner of the Orix BlueWave baseball team. The new owner then announced that the financially challenged Buffaloes and BlueWave would be merged into one team, called the Orix Buffaloes, before the start of the 2005 NPB season. At the time, Kintetsu Railway, the Buffaloes' owners, were in ¥1.3 trillion (or $11.2 billion today) in debt. This caused Buffaloes legend Tuffy Rhodes to sign with the Yomiuri Giants as Kintetsu was not able to strike up the multi year deal he wanted.

The proposed merger of the teams led to the biggest crisis in the traditional two-league structure in NPB and finally caused the first baseball player strike in Japan. The dispute officially ended after the two groups reached consensus on September 23, 2004. As part of the agreement, the Rakuten Golden Eagles were newly created (at a reduced "entry fee") to keep the former six-team league structure. Other agreements included the leagues adopting interleague play to help the Pacific League gain exposure by playing the more popular Central league teams. All these changes took place before the 2005 season.

Players of note

Former players

Japanese
Toshiya Adachi (安達 俊也) 
Motoyuki Akahori (赤堀 元之)
Hiromasa Arai (新井 宏昌) 
Hideyuki Awano (阿波野 秀幸)
Masahiro Doi (土井 正博) 
Takashi Imoto (井本 隆)
Hiroo Ishii (石井 浩郎) 
Koichi Isobe (磯部 公一)
Hisashi Iwakuma (岩隈 久志)
Ken Kadokura (門倉 健)
Yoshiaki Kanemura (金村 義明) 
Hideo Koike (小池 秀雄) 
Tetsuya Matoyama (的山 哲也) 
Eiji Mizuguchi (水口 栄二)
Norihiro Nakamura (中村 紀洋) 
Masataka Nashida (梨田 昌孝)
Hideo Nomo (野茂 英雄) 
Naoyuki Ohmura (大村 直之)
Daijiro Oishi (大石 大二郎)  
Kazuyoshi Ono (小野 和義)
Koji Ota (太田 幸司)
Akinori Otsuka (大塚 晶則)
Tomotaka Sakaguchi (坂口 智隆) 
Osamu Sasaki (佐々木 修) 
Junzo Sekine (関根 潤三)
Keishi Suzuki (鈴木 啓示) 
Takahisa Suzuki (鈴木 貴久)
Hiroshi Takamura (高村 祐) 
Shintaro Yamasaki (山崎 慎太郎)
Masato Yoshii (吉井 理人)
Yuji Yoshioka (吉岡 雄二)

Foreign players
Andy Abad
Kyle Abbott
Mike Andrews
Luis Aquino
Chris Arnold
Gene Bacque
Sean Bergman
Billy Bean
Buddy Bradford
Ralph Bryant
Ozzie Canseco
Phil Clark
Alvin Davis
Dick Davis
Pat Dodson
Chris Donnels
Narciso Elvira
Chuck Essegian
Freddy García
Shawn Gilbert
Jim Gentile
David Green
Ike Hampton
Mike Johnson
Terry Lee
Phil Leftwich
Charlie Manuel
Glenn Mickens
Bob Milacki
Don Money
Ben Oglivie
Dennis Powell
Jim Qualls
R. J. Reynolds
Karl "Tuffy" Rhodes
Bombo Rivera
Germán Rivera
Dave Roberts
Johnny Ruffin
Brian Shouse
Lee Stevens
Jim Traber
Carlos Valdez
Nigel Wilson
Bob Wolcott
Larry Wolfe

Retired numbers
  (鈴木 啓示)

Managers
  (1950-1952)
  (1953-1957)
  (1958)
  (1959-1961)
  (1962-1964)
  (1965-1966)
  (1967)
  (1968-1970)
  (1971-1973)
  (1974-1981)
  (1982-1983)
  (1984-1987)
  (1988-1992)
  (1993-1995)
  (1996-1999)
  (2000-2004)

Mascots 

The Buffaloes had 2 mascots, named Buffie and Falulu (バフィリード and ファルルリーナ). Buffie is a male buffalo and was introduced in 1997. He also appeared on the team logo. Falulu is a female buffalo. Buffie's jersey number is 100 while Falulu's is 200. They were retired in 2005 after the Buffaloes merged with the then-named Orix BlueWave (present day Orix Buffaloes). Buffie reappeared in a Buffaloes reprint match in 2013. They also had 2 other mascots as part of the same group, named Capelot and Balbarock, with Capelot being a much more child-like character, whilst Balbarock was supposed to resemble the club's cap logo. Both were retired in 2000. All 4 were designed by Hanna-Barbera Productions, and their backstory was that they lived in a fantasy world of dreams and adventures named "Buffalo Valley", as described in the club's 1997 supporters' handbook. However, after the merger, only Buffie's copyright trademark was transferred to Orix Corporation.

Before they were introduced, the team's mascot was a human character named Buffer (バッファくん), who served as the team mascot from 1976 to 1996. Logos of him usually depicted him holding a baseball bat and a ball, wearing the Buffaloes cap, raising one leg, whilst wearing Asics spiked shoes. However, a secondary logo primarily used by the team only had him holding a bat and ball. His jersey number was 100. He was designed by Yoshio Shirakawa. He was retired in 1997 following the Buffaloes' major logo and jersey overhaul, coinciding with their move to the Osaka Dome.

References

External links 

History of the Kintetsu Buffaloes 
The dramatic determination of championship in Pacific League

 
Defunct Nippon Professional Baseball teams
Baseball teams established in 1949
1949 establishments in Japan
Baseball teams disestablished in 2004
2004 disestablishments in Japan